Zanclognatha laevigata, the variable zanclognatha, is a litter moth of the family Erebidae. It was described by Augustus Radcliffe Grote in 1872. It is found in North America from Manitoba to Nova Scotia, south to Florida and Missouri.

There is one generation per year.

The larvae feed on detritus, including dead leaves.

External links

laevigata
Moths described in 1872
Moths of North America
Taxa named by Augustus Radcliffe Grote